Jan Klimków (born 21 December 1998) is a Polish handball player for Gwardia Opole and the Polish national team.

References

1998 births
Living people
People from Grodków
Sportspeople from Opole Voivodeship
Polish male handball players